Lotfi Baccouche (19 June 1973 – May 1999) was a Tunisian footballer. He competed in the men's tournament at the 1996 Summer Olympics.

References

1973 births
1999 deaths
Tunisian footballers
Tunisia international footballers
Olympic footballers of Tunisia
Footballers at the 1996 Summer Olympics
Place of birth missing (living people)
Association football midfielders